Oscar Hernández (born March 22, 1954) is an American pianist, arranger and producer of Puerto Rican descent.

Life and career

Early years
Hernández's family moved to the United States from Puerto Rico in the 1940s, in search of a better way of life. They settled down in the South Bronx, a ghetto, which is a section that is heavily populated by latinos in New York where Hernández was born. Hernández who was the youngest of eleven siblings, received his primary and secondary education in the city's public school system.

Early musical influences
As a child he was exposed to the music of Tito Puente, Tito Rodríguez and Willie Colón among others. He would also sneak into nightclubs to watch and listen to the music of Ray Barretto, Eddie Palmieri and Richie Ray. Hernández was determined to leave the ghetto after witnessing the death of one of his brothers. In 1966, he took trumpet playing classes at a local Boys Club. Two years later someone gave his brother a piano, which he kept in the basement of the apartment building where the family lived. Some of the local musicians, who would get together and jam in the basement, showed Hernández the basics of piano playing; the rest was self-taught.

Recording debut
Hernández began playing with some local bands, among them was Joey Pastrana and La Conquistadora, with whom he made his recording debut with "Don Pastrana". In 1972, he was hired by Ismael Miranda and after playing with Miranda he went to work for Ray Barretto. With Barretto, he gained experience in musical arrangements and was introduced to the jazz music of Charlie Parker and Dizzy Gillespie. Hernández played an instrumental role in the recording of "Rican Struction", which is considered as a Latin classic. After six years with Barretto, he met Rubén Blades and joined his group Seis Del Solar.

Hernández enrolled in the City University of New York. His professors were lenient because they understood that he was often on tour, Eventually he earned his bachelor's degree in Music. Hernández has performed with Tito Puente, Celia Cruz, Julio Iglesias, Juan Luis Guerra, Willie Colón, Oscar D'León and for the groups Libre and Folkorico Experimental. He also produced records for Rubén Blades, Willie Colón, Daniel Ponce, Rafael DeJesus, Eddie Torres and Phil Hernandez.

The Spanish Harlem Orchestra
Hernández was the founder, music director and pianist for the Spanish Harlem Orchestra. This came about when he met Aaron Levinson, a music producer who had a contract with Warner Brothers. The idea of forming a group came about and the Spanish Harlem Orchestra was born. The group received a Grammy Award nomination in 2002 for "Best Salsa Album, a Billboard Award in 2003 for "Salsa Album of the year and in 2005 a Grammy Award for "Best Salsa Album".

Broadway musical The Capeman
Musician Paul Simon asked Hernández to arrange and produce the music for the Broadway musical The Capeman, which is based on the real-life story of Salvador Agron. His work also required that he be the Musical Director and Conductor. Hernández was the musical director and arranger for the theatre shows Quien mató a Héctor Lavoe (Who murdered Héctor Lavoe) and La Lupe.

Hernández played piano on the theme score for the HBO television series Sex and the City. He has also written the musical score for some of the commercial jingles for various companies, among them: Dunkin' Donuts, Waldbaums, General Motors and Covergirl.

Later years
Hernández, who is married with children, continues to be active with the Spanish Harlem Orchestra. He arranged the music for the documentaries If the Mango Tree Could Speak by Pat Gaudvis, Angélica tiene un bebé by Paula Heredia and Cuban Roots/Bronx Stories by Pam Sporn. In 2009, Hernández directed the recording of Songs of the Capeman with the participation of Obie Bermúdez, Danny Rivera, Ray de la Paz, Claudette Sierra and Frankie Negrón. In 2012, Shepherd University (Cornel School of Contemporary Music) awarded Hernández with an “Honorary Doctorate in Music Arts” for his lifelong work and commitment in the field of Afro-Latin music.

Discography

Hernández has participated in the following recordings:
 Africando "Balboa" - Oscar Hernández, Piano
 Africando "Gombo Salsa" - Oscar Hernández, Piano
 Alfredo "Chocolate" Armenteros - Oscar Hernández, Piano
 Roberto Torres & Alfredo "Chocolate" Armenteros - Oscar Hernández, Piano
 Ray Barretto "Fuerza Gigante" - Oscar Hernández, Piano
 Ray Barretto "Rhythm of Life" - Oscar Hernández, Piano
 Ray Barretto "Rican/Struction" - Oscar Hernández, Piano
 Ray Barretto "Tomorrow" - Oscar Hernández, Piano
 Ray Barretto "Tremendo Trío" - Oscar Hernández, Piano
 Rubén Blades "Agua de Luna" - Oscar Hernández, Piano
 Rubén Blades "Buscando América" - Oscar Hernández, Piano
 Rubén Blades "Caminando" - Oscar Hernández, Piano
 Rubén Blades "Escenas" - Óscar Hernández, Piano
 Rubén Blades "Rubén Blades y Son del Solar...Live!" - Oscar Hernández, Piano
 Rubén Blades "Amor y Control" - Oscar Hernández, Piano
 Rubén Blades "Nothing But The Truth" - Oscar Hernández, Piano
 Rubén Blades/Willie Colón "Tras La Tormenta" - Oscar Hernández, Producer
 Richie Cabo "Paisaje Musical" - Oscar Hernández, Piano
 Carabali "Vol. 1" - Oscar Hernández, Producer/Arranger
 Carabali "Vol. II" - Oscar Hernández, Producer/Arranger
 Conjunto Libre - Oscar Hernández, Piano
 Conjunto Libre "Con Salsa Con Ritmo" - Oscar Hernández, Piano
 Conjunto Libre "Libre Increible" - Oscar Hernández, Piano
 Rafael DeJesus "Twice As Good" - Oscar Hernández, Producer/Arranger
 Linda Eder "It's No Secret Anymore" - Oscar Hernández, Piano
 Flex "Flex Y La Rumba" - Oscar Hernández, Piano
 4 Guys Named Jose - Oscar Hernández, Producer/Arranger
 Grupo Folklorico Experimental "Vol. I & II" - Oscar Hernández, Piano
 Juan Luis Guerra - Oscar Hernández, Piano
 Juan Luis Guerra "Areíto" - Oscar Hernández, Piano
 Illegales "Dame De Eso Remix" - Oscar Hernández, Piano
 Earl Klugh "Midnight In San Juan" - Oscar Hernández, Piano
 Steve Kroon "In My Path" - Oscar Hernández, Arranger/Piano
 Latin Broadway - Oscar Hernández, Music Director/Arranger
 Latin Jazz Highlights "Messidor Records Vol. 5" - Oscar Hernández, Piano
 Ricardo Lemvo y Maquina Loca "Mambo Yoyo" - Oscar Hernández, Piano
 Ivan Lins "Love Affair" - Oscar Hernández, Piano
 Kirsty MacColl "Electric Landlady" - Oscar Hernández, Piano
 Ismael Miranda "Así Se Compone Un Son" - Oscar Hernández, Piano
 Ismael Miranda "No Voy Al Festival" - Oscar Hernández, Piano
 Luis "Perico" Ortiz "Breaking The Rules" - Oscar Hernández, Piano
 Luis "Perico" Ortiz "In Tradition" - Oscar Hernández, Piano
 Johnny Pacheco "Sima" - Oscar Hernández, Piano
 Daniel Ponce "Chango Te Llama" - Oscar Hernández, Producer/Arranger
 Domingo Quiñones "Quien Mato a Héctor Lavoe Cast Recording" - Oscar Hernández, Piano
 Pete "El Conde" Rodríguez "Esté Negro SÍ Es Sabroso" - Oscar Hernández, Piano
 Pete "El Conde" Rodriguez "Pueblo Latino" - Oscar Hernández, Piano
 Tito Rodríguez "Eclipse" - Oscar Hernández, Arranger/Piano
 Mongo Santamaría "Mongo Returns" - Oscar Hernández, Piano
 Seis Del Solar "Alternate Roots" - Oscar Hernández, Co-Leader/Producer
 Seis Del Solar "Decision" - Oscar Hernández, Co-Leader/Producer
 Paul Simon "Songs of the Capeman" - Oscar Hernández, Producer/Arranger
 Paul Simon "The Capeman Original Cast Recording" - Oscar Hernández, Producer/Arranger
 James "J.T." Taylor "A Brand New Me" - Oscar Hernández, Piano
 The Bronx Horns "Catch The Feeling" - Oscar Hernández, Piano
 The Bronx Horns "Silver In The Bronx" - Oscar Hernández, Piano
 Eddie Torres "Dance City" - Oscar Hernández, Producer/Arranger
 Dave Valentin - Oscar Hernández, Piano
 Dave Valentin "Mind Time" - Oscar Hernández, Piano
 Dave Valentin "The Hawk" - Oscar Hernández, Piano
 Dave Valentin "The Pied Piper" - Oscar Hernández, Piano
 Dave Valentin "Tropic Heat" - Oscar Hernández, Piano
 Orlando "Watussi" "Como Nunca" - Oscar Hernández, Producer/Arranger

See also

List of Puerto Ricans

References

External links
Guernica Magazine Interview
Video interview with Oscar Hernandez on Salsa Central

1954 births
Living people
American musicians of Puerto Rican descent
American salsa musicians
American male composers
20th-century American composers
20th-century American pianists
American male pianists
21st-century American pianists
20th-century American male musicians
21st-century American male musicians
Origin Records artists